Vince Stanley Joseph Horsman (born March 9, 1967) is a Canadian former professional baseball pitcher, who played five seasons in Major League Baseball for the Toronto Blue Jays, Oakland Athletics, and Minnesota Twins. Since 2009, he has coached pitching for several Blue Jay minor league affiliates.

On November 3, 2012, Horsman was inducted into the Nova Scotia Sport Hall of Fame.

In 2009, Horsman was the pitching coach for the Blue Jays' short-season Auburn Doubledays. Between 2010 and 2014, he was a part of the Class-A Lansing Lugnuts coaching staff. On December 18, 2014, he was promoted to the (Advanced-A) Dunedin Blue Jays. On January 20, 2016, he was promoted to the Double-A New Hampshire Fisher Cats, where he remained until 2019.

References

External links
, or Retrosheet
Pelota Binaria (Venezuelan Winter League)
Driver, David. "Ex-O's batting practice pitcher turns pitching coach". Explore Howard. Thursday, July 15, 2010.

1967 births
Living people
Baseball people from Nova Scotia
Canadian expatriate baseball players in the United States
Cardenales de Lara players
Chiayi-Tainan Luka players
Dunedin Blue Jays players
Florence Blue Jays players
Knoxville Blue Jays players
Major League Baseball pitchers
Major League Baseball players from Canada
Medicine Hat Blue Jays players
Minnesota Twins players
Minor league baseball coaches
Myrtle Beach Blue Jays players
Oakland Athletics players
Rochester Red Wings players
Sportspeople from Halifax, Nova Scotia
Salt Lake Buzz players
Syracuse Chiefs players
Tacoma Tigers players
Toronto Blue Jays players
Taichung Agan players
Canadian expatriate baseball players in Venezuela
Canadian expatriate baseball players in Taiwan
Nova Scotia Sport Hall of Fame inductees